The 1999 Egger Tennis Festival singles was the singles event of the twenty-ninth edition of the Egger Tennis Festival; a WTA Tier IV tournament and the second most prestigious women's tennis tournament held in Austria. Laura Montalvo and Paola Suárez were the defending champions, but they didn't compete together this year. Montalvo played with Olga Lugina as the third seed, while Suárez teamed up with Virginia Ruano Pascual as the second seed.

Ruano Pascual and Suárez were defeated in the first round with home qualifiers Barbara Schwartz and Patricia Wartusch, while Montalvo and Lugina reached the final, where they were defeated by Silvia Farina and Karina Habšudová.

Seeds

  Silvia Farina /  Karina Habšudová (champions)
  Virginia Ruano Pascual /  Paola Suárez (first round)
  Olga Lugina /  Laura Montalvo (final)
  Åsa Carlsson /  Sonya Jeyaseelan (semifinals)

Draw

Qualifying

Seeds

  Jelena Kostanić /  Gisela Riera (qualifying competition)
  Barbara Schwartz /  Patricia Wartusch (champions)

Qualifiers
  Barbara Schwartz /  Patricia Wartusch

Qualifying draw

Sources
 1999 Egger Tennis Festival Draw at WTA
 1999 Egger Tennis Festival Draw at ITF

Egger Tennis Festival
Egger Tennis Festival
1999 in Austrian tennis